The 2010 Baden Masters was held September 10-12 in Baden, Switzerland. It was the first event of the Men's World Curling Tour for the 2010-11 curling season. The total purse of the event was 26,500 Swiss francs (CHF). The winning team was the hometown Thomas Lips rink which defeated the new Brad Gushue/Randy Ferbey combination team in the final. Lips' team would win 10,000 CHF. In the bronze medal game, Norway's Thomas Ulsrud defeated Sweden's Niklas Edin.

Participating teams
 Alexander Attinger
 Tom Brewster
 Andrey Drozdov
 Niklas Edin
 Brad Gushue
 Pascal Hess
 Aleksandr Kirikov
 Thomas Lips
 Thomas Løvold
 Dominik Märki
 David Murdoch
 Mark Neeleman
 Daniel Neuner
 Claudio Pescia
 Manuel Ruch
 Christof Schwaller
 Jiří Snítil
 Thomas Ulsrud
 Markku Uusipaavalniemi
 Patrick Vuille

Draw

Playoffs

External links
WCT event site 

Baden Masters, 2010
2010 in Swiss sport
Baden Masters